Smermisia is a genus of sheet weavers that was first described by Eugène Louis Simon in 1894.

Species
 it contains five species, found in Argentina, Brazil, Costa Rica, Chile, and Venezuela:
Smermisia caracasana Simon, 1894 (type) – Venezuela
Smermisia esperanzae (Tullgren, 1901) – Chile
Smermisia holdridgi Miller, 2007 – Costa Rica
Smermisia parvoris Miller, 2007 – Brazil, Argentina
Smermisia vicosana (Bishop & Crosby, 1938) – Brazil, Argentina

See also
 List of Linyphiidae species (Q–Z)

References

Araneomorphae genera
Linyphiidae
Spiders of Central America
Spiders of South America